William Anthony Donohue (born July 18, 1947) is an American Roman Catholic who has been president of the Catholic League in the United States since 1993.

Life and career
Donohue was born in the borough of Manhattan in New York City, New York. He began his teaching career in the 1970s working at St. Lucy's School in Spanish Harlem. In 1977, he took a teaching position at La Roche College in McCandless, Pennsylvania. In 1980, he received his doctorate in sociology from New York University. Donohue is divorced and has two adult children from his marriage.

His first book was The Politics of the American Civil Liberties Union and he became associated with the conservative Heritage Foundation, for which he is an adjunct scholar.

While Donohue was in college in New York, Virgil C. Blum, a Jesuit at Marquette University in Milwaukee, Wisconsin, founded the Catholic League to counter anti-Catholicism in American culture. Blum died in 1990; in 1993, Donohue became the director of the organization.

Donohue publishes The Catalyst, the Catholic League journal. He formerly served on the board of directors of the National Association of Scholars. He serves on the board of advisers of the Washington Legal Foundation, the Howard Center for Family, Religion and Society, the Society of Catholic Social Scientists, Catholics United for the Faith, the Ave Maria Institute, the Christian Film and Television Commission and Catholic War Veterans. He received the 2005 St. Thomas More Award for Catholic Citizenship from Catholic Citizens of Illinois.

Activism
Donohue campaigns against what he perceives as the discrimination and defamation of Catholics and Catholicism. In doing so he has targeted a diverse array of organizations and individuals in entertainment, politics, and the arts. His work has produced divergent assessments. Legatus Magazine, the monthly publication of an organization for Catholic business executives, wrote:

A journalist once characterized the public perception of him as: "Donohue serves as Santa to his membership of 350,000 and Scrooge to those who run afoul of him." In 2000, an editorial in America, a Jesuit magazine, noted Donohue's bi-partisanship and willingness to break ranks with Republicans who aligned with him on most issues: "once he was cheered by Catholic neo-conservatives for attacking the media, the entertainment industry and pro-choice groups, now he was excommunicated as a loose cannon because he was shooting at their allies. Mr. Donohue's refusal to be controlled by either party is one of his most attractive qualities." One critic described him as an "identity politics ambulance chaser" and another said he represented a "right-wing publicity mill". Others found that his defense of Catholicism sometimes crossed into attacks on other groups, and he has been accused of homophobia or even "anti-gay bullying" and antisemitism.

Free speech
In 2015, Al-Qaeda in the Arabian Peninsula took responsibility for a terror attack on Charlie Hebdo that killed 17 people and wounded 12 in Paris, including the editor of Charlie Hebdo, who had been on an Al-Qaeda hit list. Commenting on the attack, Donohue wrote an article titled "Muslims are right to be angry":

Donohue stated on Fox News "Self censorship is the friend of freedom" and that free speech should not permit "obscene portrayal of religious figures". Hugh Hewitt, a conservative Catholic talk show host, called Donohue "an embarrassment" to Catholics for his statement, saying "You blamed the victim before their bodies were cold" and "You are standing over the bodies of twelve dead people, including two policemen, one yesterday and one today, who knows who else is going to get killed in France during the course of this thing, and you are saying they were justified because they were insulted".

Climate change
In response to Laudato si', Donohue described Pope Francis as "the ultimate maverick" on The Alan Colmes Show, saying "the left is going to like the fact that he has more of a socialist model in terms of his vision of the structure of the economy. He's anti-market in the encyclical." Donohue criticised The New York Times editorial board, saying they want "the pope to shove his teachings down" the throats of Republican legislators.

Marriage
Donohue believes marriage is "not about love" or "making people happy" but that one fundamental and inextricable purpose of marriage is to have a family.

Sexual abuse by priests
In 2009, after the release of the official report of the Ryan Commission, whose findings included multiple instances of rape and persuasive evidence of endemic sexual, emotional, and physical abuse throughout the Catholic School system in Ireland, Donohue publicly denied these criminal charges and characterized the media response to the Ryan Report as "hysterical". He argued that most offenses occurred before 1970 when "corporal punishment", as Donohue termed it, was not thought unacceptable, and referred to the victims as "miscreants". He noted the report's broad definitions of abuse, which included neglect and emotional abuse. Since the majority of priests are not rapists, he judged news headlines like Reuters' "Irish Priests Beat, Raped Children" were "wild and irresponsible", regardless of whether or not the headlines were true. He blamed the report and the journalists in turn.

On March 30, 2010, Donohue appeared on CNN's Larry King Live on a panel discussing sexual abuse of children by priests. Donohue contended that the decades-old problem consisted mostly of offenses involving post-pubescent boys aged 12 or more, which offenses therefore, according to Donohue, should be considered the acts of homosexual priests, rather than the actions of pedophiles. Donohue also pointed to the independent John Jay Report, which stated that 81% of the victims were male and 78% were post pubescent.

In August 2018, Donohue responded to a report by a Pennsylvania grand jury that revealed rampant sexual abuse of children by some 300 priests by stating that the victims weren't raped because they were only groped, not penetrated.

"There is no on-going crisis," he tweeted. "In fact, there is no institution, private or public, that has less of a problem with the sexual abuse of minors today than the Catholic Church." Several individuals quickly condemned his statement; John Podhoretz, the editor of Commentary Magazine, said, "Bill Donohue's soul quickly leaked out of his body." Jim Lokay, an anchor for the Washington, D.C., affiliate of Fox News, tweeted that the Catholic League's statement was "One of the most shameful, ignorant, tone-deaf, arrogant tweets I've ever seen."

Television and film
In 1995, Donohue, joined by evangelical leaders, called for a boycott of Disney for distributing the British film Priest, which depicted one priest struggling with his homosexuality and another involved in an affair with a woman. Donohue said the film was "designed intentionally to insult the Catholic Church and Catholics nationwide". The boycott had no impact, but helped Disney recognize the market for entertainment with religious themes.

For months in 1997 Donohue promoted a boycott of the advertisers of the television show Nothing Sacred, the story of "a sexy Catholic priest, Father Ray, who sometimes doubts his faith". Cardinal Roger Mahony of Los Angeles and the National Catholic Reporter opposed Donohue's efforts. Some advertisers stopped placing ads with the show because of the controversy, but the show found replacements.

One study of the show said that the television series The Simpsons presented Catholicism with humor that had an "undeniably hostile, sometimes gratuitous edge to it" for years. Donohue objected to some dialogue in a November 1998 episode and other material in a January 1999 show that, in his view, made Catholicism the butt of a joke. In one case network executives substituted the name of a Protestant denomination for Catholic in later rebroadcasts.

In 1999, before the release of Kevin Smith's film Dogma, Donohue reported that he had read the script and found it objectionable. He said: "Quite naturally, the actors and film critics who like the movie are not disturbed by the anti-Catholicism that they themselves acknowledge, however unwittingly." After viewing the film in November, he wrote:

Smith later said that the film proved less offensive than its critics had anticipated and that Donohue "actually invited me out to have a beer after making my life hell for six months".

In December 2004, Donohue discussed Mel Gibson's movie The Passion of the Christ. During a discussion of the film on the television show Scarborough Country, Donohue said:

When Rabbi Shmuley Boteach responded calling Donohue's statement "anti-Semitic garbage", and saying: "I have got to tell you that Bill Donohue ... ought to be ashamed of himself, the way he’s spoken about secular Jews hating Christians. That is a bunch of crap, OK?”,  Donohue said:

In November 2005, he criticized an episode of CSI: Crime Scene Investigation for promoting "a pro-abortion rights agenda by portraying those who are opposed to abortion as religious nuts not to be taken seriously".

In the spring of 2006, after Comedy Central refused to allow its animated television series South Park to show an image of Muhammad, Donohue said the show's creators Trey Parker and Matt Stone, whom he had frequently criticized, should have protested that censorship by resigning, but instead "Like little whores, they'll sit there and grab the bucks. They'll sit there and they'll whine and they'll take their shot at Jesus. That's their stock in trade." The next season, South Park parodied Donohue in the episode "Fantastic Easter Special". The episode depicts Donohue as a power-hungry Catholic official who usurps the Pope and sentences Jesus to death as a heretic; he is eventually killed by Jesus. Donohue took the episode in good humor, displaying a still from it in his office depicting him wearing the pope's miter. Describing the episode's plot to The New York Times, he said "...they have me overthrow the pope because the pope is a wimp, and then I take over the church and give it some guts. ...But in the end, Jesus kills me."

Donohue, along with a number of other religious leaders, criticized the children's fantasy epic The Golden Compass. Donohue said that the trilogy of books on which the screenplay was based, His Dark Materials, "denigrate Christianity, thrash the Catholic Church and sell the virtues of atheism". Though the film eliminated what he found offensive, he deemed it a "stealth campaign" to sell the books to readers unaware of their content. The impact of the resulting controversy on the film's commercial performance was uncertain.

War on Christmas
Donohue has regularly campaigned against the secularization of Christmas, which he describes as "the diluting and dumbing down of the cultural and religious significance of Christmas." An Associated Press story once explained: "As it is for millions of people, Christmas is Bill Donohue's busy season. While others spend time wrapping and shopping, Donohue stays busy sniping." He described the challenge: "It's political correctness run amok. Every day I'm putting out a statement about the latest absurdity. ...This time of year, you can just bank on it."

In December 2005, he criticized Christmas cards sent by U.S. President George W. Bush for using the term "holiday season" and not mentioning "Christmas". He said: "This clearly demonstrates that the Bush administration has suffered a loss of will and that they have capitulated to the worst elements in our culture." In 2010, after an atheists organization used a billboard at the entrance to the Lincoln Tunnel to display the message "You KNOW it's a myth!" across the scene of the magi traveling to the manger at Bethlehem, the Catholic League responded with a billboard of its own. Donohue said "We can't enjoy the Christmas season without someone trying to dumb it down or neuter it" and added: "Talk about a myth. They believe in nothing. They stand for nothing. They think we came from nothing. They're the ones who really are living in some other hollow world."

In 2013, he announced plans for a billboard reading "Send Modern-Day Scrooges a Message: Celebrate the Prince of Peace". As "a tongue-in-cheek statement against political correctness", he proposed a list of "Office Party Rules to Ignore" that included eliminating dress rules so women could display cleavage and scheduling the affair for a Friday to encourage alcohol consumption. It concluded: "We happen to be Irish Catholics, a lot of us here, we're going to play to the stereotype."

Homosexuality
Donohue has been a consistent critic of same-sex marriage.

In 2010, Frank Rich said that when Donohue extended his criticism of an art exhibit from one work he considered anti-religious and complained that it included "pornographic images of gay men", he "was just using his 'religious' objections as a perfunctory cover for the homophobia actually driving his complaint".

Politics
Early in the 2000 presidential campaign, Donohue criticized President George W. Bush for appearing at Bob Jones University, whose head once called Catholicism "the religion of the Antichrist and a satanic system." He welcomed Bush's letter of apology for failing to make his opposition to the school's anti-Catholicism clear, saying: "One of the great touchstones of Catholicism is forgiveness for the wrongdoer who admits that he or she is wrong, and there's nothing to be gained by beating this dead horse." He also criticized some of his co-religionists: "There are some Catholics who are so desperate to get a Republican back in the White House, they're willing to overlook anything. Our feeling is, let the pus come to the surface." He raised a similar issue a few weeks later when the Republican leadership of the U.S. House of Representatives appointed a Protestant chaplain rather than the Catholic priest who received the greatest support from the bipartisan committee charged with the selection. Donohue ignored suggestions that he was not helping calm the situation by protesting. He said: "There is a segment of the evangelical Protestant community that is anti-Catholic. It has been there for a long, long time. Everyone is saying, 'Let's not talk about it.' I don't want a strain between Catholics and Protestants, but I'm not going to paper this over." Within a few weeks, the Protestant chaplain withdrew and Hastert appointed the House's first Catholic chaplain, though not the original candidate.

Later in 2000, he condemned Patrick Buchanan for launching his presidential campaign at Bob Jones: "Buchanan is not alone among Catholics who have no problem recognizing anti-Catholicism when it stems from the academy or Hollywood, but are utterly unable to do so when it comes from their 'friends.' The Catholic League does not suffer from this disability and that is why we will continue to denounce anti-Catholic bigotry independent of its origins." By contrast, he excused John Ashcroft for accepting an honorary degree before Bob Jones' views became widely known.

In December 2007, he objected to a television commercial that former Arkansas governor Mike Huckabee was using in his campaign for the Republican presidential nomination. The ad showed the candidate seated in front of a stained glass window that displayed, in Donohue's view, an image of the cross while Huckabee described the importance of Christmas and family. Donohue said: "This is just injecting religion into politics even too far for guys like me." He believed Huckabee was identifying his religion to attack Mitt Romney's Mormon faith.

During the 2008 presidential race, Donohue called for Obama to disband his campaign's Catholic National Advisory Council, which he said represented only "dissident Catholics," most with perfect ratings from the National Abortion Rights Action League.

In March 2009, he criticized President Obama's selection of Kansas Governor Kathleen Sebelius to head the Department of Health and Human Services, calling her "one of the most extreme pro-abortion zealots in the nation".

In June 2016, following the close of the New York State legislature without action on legislation designed to help survivors of childhood sexual abuse, Donohue wrote: "The bill was sold as justice for the victims of sexual abuse, when, in fact, it was a sham: the proposed legislation that failed to make it to the floor of the New York State legislature in the wee hours of Saturday ... was a vindictive bill pushed by lawyers and activists out to rape the Catholic Church."

Catholic higher education
Donohue called the decision of the University of Notre Dame to award an honorary degree to President Obama in 2009 "a slap in the face to the bishops" of the U.S. "given what the bishops have clearly asked of Catholic institutions".

Anti-Catholicism
He protested against what he considers employment discrimination against Catholics, in the case of a woman required by her supervisor to remove the Ash Wednesday ashes from her forehead in 2005. In 2007, when a substitute high school teacher in Georgia wiped the ashes from a student's forehead and berated her, Donohue called for the teacher to be disciplined. When school officials reported that the teacher had been "counseled and cautioned", Donohue called the teacher's behavior "morally reprehensible" and asked state education officials to investigate the incident.

He faulted the owners of the Empire State Building for failing to honor Mother Teresa in 2010 and Cardinal Timothy Dolan in 2012. He said: "There's no question that they're much more at home honoring mass murderers there at the Empire State Building and I'm not being facetious. They honored Mao Zedong and others for the 60th anniversary of the Communist Revolution here a few years ago, who took with him 77 million innocent Chinese men, women, and children".

Public art
In 1999, Donohue called for people to picket the Brooklyn Museum of Art to protest its display of a painting by Chris Ofili titled "The Holy Virgin Mary" that, according to The New York Times, depicted "a black Madonna with a clump of elephant dung on one breast and cutouts of genitalia from pornographic magazines in the background".

On November 30, 2010, Donohue denounced a piece of video art, A Fire in My Belly by David Wojnarowicz, that was included in an exhibition of gay and lesbian portraiture at the Smithsonian Institution's National Portrait Gallery. The piece included a scene with ants crawling on a crucifix. Donohue called the video "anti-Christian hate speech" and called for its removal, which the Smithsonian did. Frank Rich described the work as consistent with the use of religious imagery in the Western tradition: "A crucifix is besieged by ants that evoke frantic souls scurrying in panic as a seemingly impassive God looked on." During an interview with National Public Radio about the incident, Donohue questioned the Smithsonian's status as a tax-supported institution:

The Association of Art Museum Directors called the Smithsonian's decision "extremely regrettable", and Olga Viso, director of the Walker Art Center and formerly of the Smithsonian, said her former employer had "perhaps lost touch with some of the core principles and spirit of its establishment". One of the exhibit's curators said that Donohue represented an anti-Semitic hate group that viewed gays and lesbians as "raw meat" in the culture wars.

In 2012, a Manhattan art gallery displayed "Immersion (Piss Christ)", a photograph by Andres Serrano that depicts a small plastic crucifix submerged in the artist's urine. Donohue protested at a news conference outside the gallery and was then denied admission. He pointed out that the Obama administration had recently criticized a film critical of Islam, Innocence of Muslims, but said nothing about Serrano's work. He made his own video of an Obama bobblehead doll with a brown substance, actually "brown Play-Doh", he said, to demonstrate "that the cultural and political elite are basically secularist; they don't believe in God." Pointing to the jar in the video he said: "This is their god."

Individuals
Donohue has had a long-running dispute with political and social commentator Bill Maher.

Comedian Kathy Griffin in her 2007 Primetime Emmy acceptance speech, mocked award recipients who thanked God when accepting awards by saying "So all I can say is suck it, Jesus, this award is my god now!" Donohue called her language "obscene and blasphemous" and said: "It is a sure bet that if Griffin had said, 'Suck it, Muhammad,' there would have been a very different reaction".

In 2010, after the openly gay pop star Elton John described Jesus as a "compassionate, super-intelligent gay man who understood human problems", Donohue objected:

Discussing Christopher Hitchens's study of Mother Teresa, he termed the author "totally overrated as a scholar ... sloppy in his research", but nevertheless found much to admire, saying: "[I]n many respects he was a brilliant guy, he was quick, he was a provocateur, and that's the part of Christopher Hitchens that I loved. But when it came to the facts it didn't seem to matter to him." Donohue said he and Hitchens agreed on abortion, though Hitchens' views on abortion were not exactly those of Donohue. In 1993, Hitchens characterized his thinking as "I have my doubts about abortion. I find I'm very squeamish on the subject".

Writings
 The Politics of the American Civil Liberties Union (Transaction Publishers, 1985), 
 The New Freedom: Individualism and Collectivism in the Social Lives of Americans (Transaction Publishers, 1991)
 Twilight of Liberty: The Legacy of the ACLU, (1994)
 Secular Sabotage: How Liberals Are Destroying Religion and Culture in America (NY: FaithWords, 2009), 
 Why Catholicism Matters: How Catholic Virtues Can Reshape Society in the Twenty-First Century (2012)
 The Catholic Advantage: Why Health, Happiness, and Heaven Await the Faithful (2015)
 Unmasking Mother Teresa's Critics (2016)
 Common Sense Catholicism: How to Resolve Our Cultural Crisis (2019)
 The Truth About Clergy Sexual Abuse: Clarifying the Facts and Causes (2021)

Notes

References

External links
 Catholic League For Religious and Civil Rights
 

1947 births
Anti-Masonry
The Heritage Foundation
American people of Irish descent
Living people
People from Manhattan
Roman Catholic activists
National Association of Scholars
Activists from New York (state)
Catholics from New York (state)